The 2010 Regional Municipality of Wood Buffalo municipal election was held Monday, October 18, 2010. Since 1968, provincial legislation has required every municipality to hold triennial elections. The citizens of Wood Buffalo, (this includes the Urban Service Area of Fort McMurray,) Alberta, elected one mayor, eight of their ten councillors, the five Fort McMurray Public School District trustees (in Fort McMurray), three of the Northland School Division No. 61's 23 school boards (outside Fort McMurray, three or five trustees each), and the five Fort McMurray Roman Catholic Separate School District No. 32 trustees (in Fort McMurray). The two incumbent Ward 2 councillors had no challengers, and the school boards for Anzac and Janvier were acclaimed.

Results
Bold indicates elected, and incumbents are italicized.

Mayor

Councillors
Council consists of ten members, six from Ward 1, two from Ward 2, one from Ward 3, and one from Ward 4.

Public School Trustees

Separate School Trustees

By-election
Following being elected as MLAs in the April 2012 provincial election, Ward 1 Councillors Mike Allen and Don Scott resigned their seats on council. A by-election was held on June 25, 2012, this time being contested by 14 Fort McMurray residents.

References

External links
Regional Municipality of Wood Buffalo: Election 2010

Wood Buffalo
Regional Municipality of Wood Buffalo